Les Escoumins is a municipality in La Haute-Côte-Nord Regional County Municipality in the Côte-Nord region of Quebec.  It is located on the north shore of the Saint Lawrence River.

Its economy is mostly based on the service sectors, especially education, health, and tourism. It is accessible via Route 138; a ferry service runs between Les Escoumins and Trois-Pistoles.

Etymology
Its name has traditionally been recognized to come from the Montagnais iskomin, meaning "where there are many seeds" or "there are fruits or seeds", in turn from the roots isko or ishko ("as far as this/that") and min (red seeds, or wild berries in general). According to more recent theory, it could also be a variation of the Mi'kmaq term eskumunaak, meaning "lookout place". In addition, other sources say that the place is named Essipit in Montagnais, meaning "river of shells".

Several spellings have been used over the centuries such as Uscamin, Les Escoumains, Essuie-Mains, L'Esquemin, Lesquemin, Leschemin (Champlain, 1629), L'Esquemain, and Lesquemain (1611 map of Champlain and other texts of 1626). The oldest reference to this name dates back to the map of Levasseur of 1601, that shows Escanimes; and to a contract of 1604 that included the rare spelling Esguenim.

History
The area is considered the cradle of the Côte-Nord Amerindian, who have lived there for thousands of years. The Montagnais and Mi'kmaq frequent the area, particularly in the spring to gather berries that covered the rocks and adorned the mossy plains.

The first Europeans in the area were the Basques around the 1630s. In 1723, a cross was erected in honour of Our Dame of Bon-Désir, whereafter the place was also known as Bon-Desir. That same year the Mission of Saint-Marcellin was founded. But the first permanent European settler in Escoumins was Joseph Moreau, an employee of the Hudson's Bay Company, who arrived in 1825. It wasn't until 1845 that a real village began to form when many families from the South Shore, especially from Trois-Pistoles, Rivière-Ouelle, Rimouski, and a group of Charlevoix settled there.

In 1853, the local post office opened. The timber trade caused the village to grow rapidly when logs were floated down the Escoumins River from the cutting area to the Bay des Escoumins where they were loaded in barges. In 1863, the Municipality of Les Escoumains was formed. In the beginning of 1957, the spelling of the municipality's name was corrected to the current form.

Institutions
The village is currently the largest of the so-called "Secteur BEST" (i.e. the municipalities of Bergeronnes, Escoumins, Sacre-Coeur, Tadoussac). It is home to a hospital (The Centre de santé de la Haute-Côte-Nord, previously known as Hôpital St-Alexandre), an Indian Reservation (Essipit, a montagnais community), the Poste de Pilotage des Laurentides (part of the St-Lawrence Seaway), and is an internationally known scuba diving site. An FM radio station, CHME, is located within Essipit.

Demographics

Population trend:
 Population in 2016: 1891 {2011 to 2016 population change:-5.5%}
 Population in 2011: 2000 (2006 to 2011 population change: -3.5%)
 Population in 2006: 2073 {2001 to 2006 population change:-2.5%}
 Population in 2001: 2106 {1996 to 2001 population change:-2.4%}
 Population in 1996: 2136 {1991 to 1996 population change:-4.4%}
 Population in 1991: 2212

Private dwellings occupied by usual residents: 848 (total dwellings: 918)

Mother tongue:
 English as first language: 0%
 French as first language: 99.5%
 English and French as first language: 0%
 Other as first language: 0.5%

See also
 List of municipalities in Quebec

References

Municipalities in Quebec
Incorporated places in Côte-Nord
1825 establishments in the British Empire
La Haute-Côte-Nord Regional County Municipality